Gorizia Centrale railway station ((former name)) is  the main station serving the town and comune of Gorizia, in the autonomous region of Friuli-Venezia Giulia, northeastern Italy.

Overview
Opened in 1860, the station forms part of the Udine–Trieste railway, and is also a junction station for an international branch line linking Gorizia with Ajdovščina in nearby Slovenia.

The station is currently managed by Rete Ferroviaria Italiana (RFI).  However, the commercial area of the passenger building is managed by Centostazioni.  Train services to and from the station are operated by Trenitalia.  Each of these companies is a subsidiary of Ferrovie dello Stato (FS), Italy's state-owned rail company.

Location
Gorizia Centrale railway station is situated at Piazzale Martiri per la Libertà d'Italia, at the southwestern edge of the city centre.

History
Located at that time in the territory of the Austrian Empire, the station then had the dual name of Görz/Gorizia and was operated by the Imperial Royal Privileged Southern Railway Company of Austria, Venice and central Italy.

In 1902, the station became a junction station for the branch line to Ajdovščina (German:), built by the Austrian imperial society , which awarded management rights to the Südbahngesellschaft.

Four years later, upon the opening of the Jesenice-Trieste railway (part of the network of railway lines known as the Transalpine Railway), the station took on the dual designation of Görz Südbahnhof/Gorizia Meridionale, to distinguish it from its counterpart on the new line, the Görz Staatsbahnhof/Gorizia stazione delle ferrovie dello stato (now the Nova Gorica railway station). The two systems were connected by a short rail link using part of the branch line to Ajdovščina.

Under the Treaty of Saint-Germain-en-Laye (1919), the two stations went to the Kingdom of Italy, and the FS became the operator of both. Over the next twelve years, the station on the Udine-Trieste railway changed its name several times: initially it retained only its Italian name Gorizia Meridionale, then it became Gorizia Campagnuzza, and since 1923 it has been Gorizia Centrale.

Features
Inside the station, there are ticket windows, ticket machines, a lounge, a bar, a newsagency, and passport photo machines.

All the regional trains travelling on the Udine-Trieste railway stop at the station, and some of them terminate there.

Train services
The movement of passengers is about 1.4 million people a year, which means that the station is the fifth busiest station in Friuli-Venezia Giulia in terms of numbers of passengers.

The station is served by the following service(s):

Night train (Intercity Notte) Rome - Bologna - Venice - Udine - Trieste
Express services (Regionale Veloce) Venice - Treviso - Udine - Gorizia - Trieste
Regional services (Treno regionale) Venice - Treviso - Udine - Gorizia - Trieste

See also

History of rail transport in Italy
List of railway stations in Friuli-Venezia Giulia
Rail transport in Italy
Railway stations in Italy
Nova Gorica railway station

References

External links

History and pictures of Gorizia Centrale railway station 
This article is based upon a translation of the Italian language version as at November 2010.

Centrale Railway Station
Railway stations in Friuli-Venezia Giulia
Railway stations opened in 1860